Patricia Deats Jehlen is a former teacher and current Massachusetts State Senator of the Democratic Party. She represents the Second Middlesex District.  That includes the cities of Cambridge, wards 9 to 11, inclusive, Medford and Somerville, and the town of Winchester, precincts 4 to 7, inclusive, in the County of Middlesex. She has served the Massachusetts State Senate since 2005. She also served the Massachusetts House of Representatives from 1991–2003. She resides in Somerville, MA.

Early life and education
Deats was born October 14, 1943 in Austin, Texas, the first child of Paul Deats, a Methodist minister, and Ruth, a community activist and Girl Scout leader. She has two younger sisters, Carolyn and Fran, and a younger brother, Randy. The family moved to Massachusetts in 1950, when Paul took a job at the Boston University School of Theology.

Jehlen later attended Swarthmore College, receiving a B.A. in history, and Harvard University, completing a master's degree in teaching. She later received a second master's degree from the University of Massachusetts Boston, in history. She currently taught a course in Health Politics and Public Policy at the Boston University School of Public Health. Jehlen began her career as a secondary school history teacher.

Somerville School Committee
In 1976, Jehlen ran and was elected to the Somerville School Committee.

She served on the school committee until 1991, acting as its chair in 1980 and 1988. During this time, she was among the founders of the CHOICE program, a public school alternative elementary program and helped found the Council for Fair School Finance, which brought a successful lawsuit leading to the Massachusetts education reform of 1993.

Massachusetts House of Representatives

Jehlen served from 1991 to 2005 in the Massachusetts House of Representatives, where she served as Co-Chairman of the Progressive Legislator's Group (PLG), Co-Chairman of the Elder Caucus, and Vice-Chairman of the Committee on Elder Affairs. Among her successful legislation were bills to increase literacy for blind people, ensure the rights of people living with mental illness, and provide compensation for the wrongfully convicted.

As chair of the Progressive Legislators Group and member of the Working Families Agenda in the House, Jehlen helped raise the minimum wage and won tax cuts for working families like increasing the earned income tax credit and adopting the senior circuit breaker

2005 Special Senate Election 

The Massachusetts Senate seat for the 2nd Middlesex district became open on April 5, 2004, following the death of Senator Charlie Shannon. A special election was soon declared to fill his seat.  Jehlen, whose state house district lay within the senate district vacated by Shannon, entered the race.  She faced three other candidates in the Democratic primary: State Representative Paul Casey of Winchester, Governor's Councilor Michael Callahan of Medford, and former State Representative Joseph Mackey, whom Jehlen had succeeded as State Representative.

Jehlen staked out her position early as "the progressive", with the support of a plethora of unions and statewide and national progressive organizations, including MassEquality, SEIU, and Democracy for America.  Although the race was considered wide open, with expectations that any of the four candidates could win,
Jehlen won a substantial victory in the August 30th primary:
 38% Pat Jehlen
 27% Joe Mackey
 22% Michael Callahan
 13% Paul Casey

She went on to defeat Republican candidate William White, Somerville alderman-at-large, in the general election on September 27, 2005, and was sworn in by Governor Mitt Romney on October 12.

Senate career 

Jehlen serves as the Senate Chair of the Joint Committee on Elder Affairs and the Senate Chair of the Committee on Labor and Workforce Development. She also serves as Senate Vice Chair of the Joint Committee on Cannabis Policy.

Jehlen, as chair of Elder Affairs, increased the Personal Needs Allowance for people in rest homes and nursing homes for the first time since it was cut in 1990. She also got $6.2 million in additional funding for homecare, allowing 260 nursing home-eligible seniors to stay in their communities. Jehlen also succeeded in bringing overdue adjustments to the needs of senior citizens, including an increase in their personal needs allowance, and to increase homemaker wages and the salary reserve for those who provide for the care of elders.

Jehlen top legislative priorities are education, universal and affordable health care, jobs with decent wages and benefits, and paid family leave.

In the Massachusetts gubernatorial election, 2014, Jehlen endorsed Don Berwick for Governor of Massachusetts

In the Democratic Party presidential primaries, 2016, Jehlen endorsed Bernie Sanders.

In the 2016 democratic primary, Jehlen won against Leland Cheung, 80% to 20%

The Massachusetts Women’s Political Caucus endorsed Jehlen as an incumbent candidate in the 2020 Massachusetts general election.

Committee assignments
191st General Court
 Chairperson, Joint Committee on Elder Affairs
 Chairperson, Joint Committee on Labor and Workforce Development
 Vice Chair, Joint Committee on Cannabis Policy
 Senate Committee on Ways and Means
 Joint Committee on Community Development and Small Businesses
 Joint Committee on Revenue
 Joint Committee on Ways and Means

190th General Court
 Chairperson, Joint Committee on Marijuana Policy
 Vice Chair, Joint Committee on Education
 Vice Chair, Joint Committee on Labor and Workforce Development
 Assistant Vice Chair, Joint Committee on Ways and Means
 Assistant Vice Chair, Senate Committee on Ways and Means
 Joint Committee on Elder Affairs
 Joint Committee on Election Laws
 Joint Committee on the Judiciary

See also 
 Massachusetts Senate
 Massachusetts Senate Delegations
 2019–2020 Massachusetts legislature
 2021–2022 Massachusetts legislature

External links

 PatJehlen.org
 A Senator-with-Heart- A Senator With Heart
 Patricia D. Jehlen on the MA legislature website

References

1943 births
Living people
Harvard Graduate School of Education alumni
Democratic Party Massachusetts state senators
Democratic Party members of the Massachusetts House of Representatives
Swarthmore College alumni
Women state legislators in Massachusetts
University of Massachusetts Boston alumni
Politicians from Somerville, Massachusetts
Boston University School of Public Health faculty
School board members in Massachusetts
21st-century American politicians
21st-century American women politicians
American women academics